Richard B. Russell Airport  is a county-owned public-use airport in Floyd County, Georgia, United States. The airport is located six nautical miles (11 km) north of the central business district of Rome, Georgia. It is also known as Richard B. Russell Regional Airport.

This airport is included in the FAA's National Plan of Integrated Airport Systems (2009-2013), which categorizes it as a general aviation facility.

The Rome Composite Squadron of the Civil Air Patrol is located at the airport. Stationed at the squadron are a Maule MT-7-235 tow plane and three Blanik gliders.

On the first Saturday of each month, the Experimental Aircraft Association hosts a fly-in breakfast at the EAA campgrounds located off the Old Dalton Road.

History 
Floyd County purchased  of land for the airport in 1942. The county turned the land over to the U.S. Navy which built three asphalt runways for a Naval Auxiliary Air Station. It was deeded back to the county in 1945, after the Navy discontinued its use of the site. The airport was then named for Richard B. Russell, Jr., who represented Georgia in the U.S. Senate from 1933 until his death in 1971.

Eastern Airlines served the airport with scheduled passenger service until the late 1960s.  Eastern operated Convair 440 propliners with service to Atlanta, Nashville and St. Louis.

Facilities and aircraft 

It has two asphalt paved runways: 1/19 measures 6,006 by 143 feet (1,831 x 44 m) and 7/25 is 4,497 by 100 feet (1,371 x 30 m). A former third runway which was designated 14/32 is closed.

For the 12-month period ending August 31, 2007, the airport had 36,703 aircraft operations, an average of 100 per day: 98% general aviation and 2% military. At that time there were 775 aircraft based at this airport: 88% military, 9% single-engine, 1% multi-engine, 1% ultralight, <1% glider, <1% jet and <1% helicopter.

References

External links 

  
 Richard B. Russell Airport (RMG) at Georgia DOT website
 
 

Airports in Georgia (U.S. state)
Buildings and structures in Floyd County, Georgia
Transportation in Floyd County, Georgia